The rivière à Saumon (English: Salmon River) is a tributary of Wapustagamau Lake, flowing in the unorganized territory of Petit-Mécatina, in the Le Golfe-du-Saint-Laurent Regional County Municipality, in the administrative region of Côte-Nord, in the province of Quebec, in Canada.

Geography 
The Salmon River generally flows southeast between the rivière Saint-Augustin Nord-Ouest and the Saint-Augustin River. The Salmon River originates at the mouth of an unidentified lake in the unorganized territory of Petit-Mécatina. This long, misshapen lake is mainly fed by four small lake outlets. This source is located at:
  south-west of the village center of Blanc-Sablon;
  north-west of the mouth of the rivière Saint-Augustin Nord-Ouest;
  north-west of the mouth of the Rivière aux Saumons.

Upper course of the salmon river (segment of )

  to the north, especially when crossing the lake ? first north, then east, to its mouth;
  to the east, in particular by crossing three lakes: the lake?; Lake ?; Lake ?, to its mouth.
  towards the south-east by crossing two small lakes; then crossing  to the south towards the lake?, to its mouth. Note: This last lake looks like a big man's head looking west;
Note: this lake receives on the southwest side the discharge of ten lakes;

Lower course of the salmon river (segment of )

  towards the east by forming a curve towards the north to go around mountains, until the mouth of a lake (coming from the southeast), that the current crosses a hundred meters;
  towards the south-east in a deep valley, crossing the lake? (length:  triangular in shape with a bay to the northwest;), to its mouth;
  to the south, crossing the lake?, to its mouth. Note: This lake receives the discharge (coming from the west) from a set of lakes and the discharge (coming from the east) from a set of lakes;
  to the south, in particular by crossing the lake in mid-segment? (length:  in rectangular form;) over its full length, up to its mouth. Note: The lake? receives the discharge (coming from the west) of three lakes.

The Salmon River flows on the north shore of Wapustagamau Lake, about halfway between the southern limit of Labrador and the north shore of the Gulf of St. Lawrence. This confluence is located at:

  south-west of the village center of Blanc-Sablon;
  north-west of the mouth of the Saint-Augustin North-West river (near the village of Saint-Augustin);
  north-west of the north shore of the Gulf of St. Lawrence.

Toponymy 
The toponym "Rivière à Saumon" was formalized on December 5, 1968, at the Place Names Bank of the Commission de toponymie du Québec.

See also 

 List of rivers of Quebec

References 

Rivers of Côte-Nord